Mitti may refer to:
 Mitti (2010 film), a Punjabi film
 Mitti (2001 film), a Hindi crime-thriller film